Henrieta Nagyová and Sylvia Plischke were the defending champions, but none competed this year. Nagyová chose to compete at Leipzig during the same week.

Evie Dominikovic and Tamarine Tanasugarn won the title by defeating Janet Lee and Wynne Prakusya 6–7(4–7), 6–2, 6–3 in the final.

Seeds

Draw

Draw

References

External links
 Official results archive (ITF)
 Official results archive (WTA)

2001 in Indonesian tennis
Sport in Bali
2001 Women's Doubles
Wismilak International - Doubles